Melvin Orlando McLaughlin (August 8, 1876 – June 18, 1928) was an American Republican Party politician.

Biography
Born in Osceola, Iowa on August 8, 1876, he moved to Nebraska in 1884. He graduated from College View High School, and graduated from the Lincoln, Nebraska Normal University and the Nebraska State Normal School at Peru (now Peru State College). He taught school near Lincoln from 1895 to 1900. He went back to school at the Iowa Christian College at Oskaloosa, Iowa; Omaha University (now University of Nebraska at Omaha), and the Union Biblical Seminary in Dayton, Ohio, becoming a minister.

He served as a minister in the United Brethren Church in Omaha from 1900 to 1913. He moved to York, Nebraska, in 1913 becoming president of York College until 1918. In 1918 he ran for the Sixty-sixth congress as a Republican representing the 4th district of Nebraska. He won the election and was reelected three more times serving from March 4, 1919, to March 3, 1927. He ran and lost in 1926 for the 70th congress. Afterwards he engaged in mining and investments. He died in York on June 18, 1928, and is buried in Greenwood Cemetery.

References

 
 
 
 

1876 births
1928 deaths
United Theological Seminary alumni
University of Nebraska Omaha alumni
Heads of universities and colleges in the United States
Republican Party members of the United States House of Representatives from Nebraska
People from Osceola, Iowa
People from York, Nebraska